The Victory Alliance is a Muslim democratic Iraqi political alliance established by former Iraqi Prime Minister Haider al-Abadi.

History
The alliance was founded on 14 December 2017 by former Iraqi Prime Minister Haider al-Abadi. Although a coalition was initially created between the Conquest Alliance and the Victory Alliance, (named Victory for Iraq), on 15 January the Conquest Alliance withdrew because they would not have gained as many seats and some groups involved in the Victory Alliance were alleged to be involved in corruption.

See also
 Alliance towards Reforms
 Fatah Alliance
 National Wisdom Movement
 State of Law Coalition

References

External links
 Official Website

2017 establishments in Iraq
Iran–Iraq relations
Islamic political parties in Iraq
Political parties established in 2017
Political parties in Iraq
Shia Islam in Iraq
Shia Islamic political parties